Belagavi district, formerly known as also Belgaum district, is a district in the state of Karnataka, India. The district is known as Sugar Bowl of Karnataka with 1.5 lakh hectares being used for commercial production and it has displaced Mandya district in sugar cane production over the last decade. The city of Belagavi is the district headquarters in North Karnataka. It houses the second legislative building, where the Karnataka Legislature will meet once a year. A popular sweet is kunda. According to the 2011 Census of India, it has a population of 4,779,661, of which 24.03% live in urban areas, making it the second most populous district in Karnataka (out of 30), after Bangalore. The district has an area of  making it the largest district in Karnataka, and is bounded by Kolhapur District and Sangli district of Maharashtra state on the west and north, on the northeast by Bijapur district, on the east by Bagalkot district, on the southeast by Gadag district, on the south by Dharwad and Uttara Kannada districts, and on the southwest by the state of Goa.

History

Belagavi is the Divisional Headquarters of North Karnataka. The original name of the town of Belgaum was Venugrama, meaning Bamboo Village. It is also known as Malnad Pradesh. The most ancient place in the district is Halsi; and this, according to inscriptions on copper plates discovered in its neighborhood, was once the capital of a dynasty of nine Kadamba kings. It appears that from the middle of the 6th century to about 760 the area was held by the Chalukyas, who were succeeded by the Rashtrakutas. After the break-up of the Rashtrakuta dynasty a portion of it survived in the Rattas (875–1250), who from 1210 onward made Venugrama their capital. Inscriptions give evidence of a long struggle between the Rattas and the Kadambas of Goa, who succeeded in the latter years of the 12th century in acquiring and holding part of the district. By 1208, however, the Kadambas had been overthrown by the Rattas, who in their turn succumbed to the Yadavas of Devagiri in 1250. After the overthrow of the Yadavas by the Delhi Sultanate (1320), Belgaum was for a short time under the rule of the latter; but only a few years later the part south of the Ghataprabha River was subject to the Hindu rajas of Vijayanagara. In 1347 the northern part was conquered by the Bahmani Sultanate, which in 1473 took the town of Belgaum and conquered the southern part also. When Aurangzeb overthrew the Bijapura sultans in 1686, Belgaum passed to the Mughals. In 1776 the country was overrun by Hyder Ali of Mysore, but was taken by the Madhavrao Peshwa . In 1818 it was handed over to the British East India Company, and was made part of the district of Dharwar. In 1836 this was divided into two parts, the northern district becoming Belgaum.

Yadur is situated beside the Krishna river, and there is a famous Veerbhadra temple there. Many devotees visit the area from Karnataka and Maharashtra. Hooli is one of the oldest villages in Belgaum district. There are many Chalukya temples in the village, including the famous Panchaligeswara temple.

Kittur in Belgaum district is a place of historical importance. Rani Chennamma of Kittur (1778–1829) is known for her resistance to British rule.

The British had a sizable infantry post here, having realised the military importance of its geographic location. It is one of the reasons for Belgaum's sobriquet The Cradle of Infantry. Development of a rail network for the movement of resources and later troops was one of the means employed by both the British East India Company and the British to exert control over India. Belgaum's railway station, the Mahatma Gandhi Railway Station was established by the British. A signboard declaring the sobriquet can be seen hung on Platform 1 at the station.

Border dispute

After India became independent in 1947, the Belagavi district (which was in the erstwhile Bombay Presidency) became a part of the Bombay State. In 1948, the Belgaum Municipality that was dominated by Marathi speaking politicians requested the Indian Dominion, Indian Constituent Assembly, and the Boundary Commission to include the Belgaum Municipal district in the proposed Samyukta Maharashtra state for the Marathi speakers.

In accordance with the established policy of bifurcation on a linguistic majority basis, in 1956, the Belgaum district was incorporated into the newly formed Mysore state (now Karnataka) with the passage of the States Reorganization Act, adjoining areas that had a majority of Marathi speaking citizens were included in the newly formed Maharashtra state.

Administrative divisions
The administration of Belgaum district has been divided into 14 taluks. 

Athani taluk is the largest with an area of 1,997.70 km2 and Raybag taluk is the smallest with an area of 958.8 km2. The district comprises three revenue sub-divisions headquartered at Belgaum, Bailhongal and Chikodi governed by an assistant commissioner and taluks headed by Tehsildar and has six police sub-divisions. Apart from the Belgaum City Corporation, there are 17 municipalities, 20 towns, 485 gram panchayats, 1,138 inhabited villages and 26 non-inhabited villages. Belgaum is also the headquarters of the Belgaum Revenue

Villages
 

Karwaish

Water Bodies
List of Rivers flowing through Belgaum District
 Krishna,
 Malaprabha,
 Ghataprabha,
 Vedhganga,
 Doodhganga,
 Mahadayi,
 Pandari,
 Hiranyakeshi

Demographics
According to the 2011 census Belagavi district has a population of 4,779,661, roughly equal to the nation of Singapore or the US state of Alabama. This gives it a ranking of 25th in India (out of a total of 640). Its population growth rate over the decade 2001–2011 was 13.38%. There were 969 females for every 1000 males, and a literacy rate of 73.94%. Scheduled Castes and Scheduled Tribes make up 12.08% and 6.22% of the population respectively.

Hindus are the biggest religion in the district with 84.49% of the population. Muslims are the second-largest with 11.06% and Jains are 3.73%.

At the time of the 2011 census, 68.40% of the population spoke Kannada, 18.70% Marathi and 9.79% Urdu as their first language.

Education
Belgaum district is a home to three universities: Visvesvaraya Technological University, Rani Channamma University, Belagavi and KLE University. Also, it has a nine engineering colleges, two medical colleges, two dental colleges, 15 polytechnics, 7 Indian system of medical colleges, and 180 degree colleges.

Industry
The district has seven industrial areas, one special economic zone (SEZ) (India's first precision engineering SEZ with more than 200 acres) and 16 industrial estates. The city's industrial growth begin when Babu Rao Pusalkar set up a small unit in city over a century ago and that transformed Belgaum city into foundry and hydraulics base. 

List of industrial clusters in Belgaum district that are identified by Ministry of Micro, Small and Medium Enterprises

Notable people
 
 

 S. Ballesh – Shehnai artist
 Hemant Birje – actor
 Phadeppa Dareppa Chaugule – India's first Olympic marathon runner
 Kittur Rani Chennamma – Freedom fighter and queen of Kittur
 Gangadharrao Deshpande – activist
 Kumar Gandharva – classical singer
 Balappa Hukkeri – singer
 Shamba Joshi – writer
 Kaka Kalelkar (1885–1981) – independence activist
 Chandrashekhara Kambara – poet
 Basavaraj Kattimani – writer, novelist
 Laxmanrao Kirloskar – businessman
 Betageri Krishnasharma – writer
 Atul Kulkarni – actor
 Sudheendra Kulkarni – Indian politician, Columnist
 Shirasangi Lingaraj – provincial ruler
 Panth Maharaj – Hindu yogi
 Belawadi Mallamma – warrior queen
 Ronit More – cricketer
 Renukamma Murugodu – actress
 Pramod Muthalik – chief of Sri Ram Sena, politician
 Bandu Patil – hockey player
 D. C. Pavate – Indian Mathematician
 Charan Raj – Indian actor
 Sangolli Rayanna – freedom fighter
 Raja Lakhamagouda Sardesai – ruler of Vantmuri princely state
 Acharya Shantisagar – Jain Digambara monk
 Shri Thanedar – Indian-American politician, businessman, scientist
 Acharya Vidyasagar – Jain Digambara monk

Publications
 Belgaum district gazetteer (1905) by Reginald Edward Enthoven
 Belgaum district gazetteer (1987) by Suryanath U. Kamath.
 Belgaum by James Macnabb Campbell (2004)

References

External links

 Official Website of Belgaum district

Districts of Karnataka
 
Belgaum division